Moisés Hurtado Pérez (born 20 February 1981) is a Spanish former professional footballer who played as a defensive midfielder.

He was noted for his physical approach, which led to many bookings, and spent most of his professional career at Espanyol, with which he played the 2007 UEFA Cup Final. He appeared in 180 official games for the club, over the course of seven La Liga seasons.

Club career
Born in Sabadell, Barcelona, Catalonia, Hurtado was a product of RCD Espanyol's youth system. He first appeared with the main squad in the last game of the 2001–02 season, still going on to spend several years with the B-team.

After a second division loan at SD Eibar, Hurtado returned as an important midfield element, renewing his contract until 2009 and scoring his first goal for the club in 2006–07, a 2–1 home win over RC Celta de Vigo in the league opener– during that campaign, he also collected 12 yellow cards. Additionally, he played against Sevilla FC in the 2007 UEFA Cup Final at Hampden Park, being sent off after receiving a second bookable offence in the 67th minute.

In 2007–08, Hurtado only missed four league matches but received 12 yellow cards. In the following season, as Espanyol fared slightly better, he produced roughly the same numbers – netting twice but being booked 13 times.

In late August 2010, 29-year-old Hurtado signed a three-year deal with Olympiacos F.C. in Greece, rejoining former Espanyol manager Ernesto Valverde. However, in the same month of the following year, he terminated his contract and returned to his country, joining top level's Granada CF for two years.

On 1 February 2013, free agent Hurtado moved to second level club Girona FC for one season. He renewed his contract after appearing in a required number of matches but, after suffering a knee injury during pre-season, all but failed to appear for them again until his release in June 2014.

Honours
Espanyol
Copa del Rey: 2005–06
UEFA Cup: runner-up 2006–07

Olympiacos
Superleague Greece: 2010–11

References

External links

1981 births
Living people
Sportspeople from Sabadell
Spanish footballers
Footballers from Catalonia
Association football midfielders
La Liga players
Segunda División players
Segunda División B players
RCD Espanyol B footballers
RCD Espanyol footballers
SD Eibar footballers
Granada CF footballers
Girona FC players
Super League Greece players
Olympiacos F.C. players
Spain youth international footballers
Catalonia international footballers
Spanish expatriate footballers
Spanish expatriate sportspeople in Greece
Expatriate footballers in Greece
UE Figueres managers